Ernst Fehr (born 21 June 1956 in Hard, Austria) is an Austrian-Swiss behavioral economist and neuroeconomist and a Professor of Microeconomics and Experimental Economic Research, as well as the vice chairman of the Department of Economics at the University of Zürich, Switzerland.  His research covers the areas of the evolution of human cooperation and sociality, in particular fairness, reciprocity and bounded rationality.

He is also well known for his important contributions to the new field of neuroeconomics, as well as to behavioral economics, behavioral finance and experimental economics. According to IDEAS/REPEC, he is the second-most influential German-speaking economist, and is ranked at 86th globally.

In 2010 Ernst Fehr founded, together with his brother, Gerhard Fehr, FehrAdvice & Partners, the first globally operating consultancy firm completely dedicated to behavioral economics.

In 2016, Fehr was ranked as the most influential economist in Germany, Austria, and Switzerland.

Awards and prizes
In 2008, Fehr won the Marcel-Benoist of 100,000 Swiss francs. In 2011, he was awarded the Vorarlberg Science Prize (€10,000); in 2012, he received the Austrian Decoration for Science and Art and on 9 April 2013 he was awarded the Gottlieb Duttweiler Prize "for his pioneering research on the role of fairness in markets, organisations and in individual decisions".

Fehr is an honorary member of the American Academy of Arts and Sciences, a member of the American Academy of Political and Social Sciences and visiting professor at the Massachusetts Institute of Technology.

In 2016, Fehr received the honorary doctorate of the University of Graz.

In 2017, Fehr was appointed as lifelong foreign honorary member of the American Economic Association, AEA, together with Philippe Aghion, an economics professor at Harvard University. The number of honorary members is limited. The election is made by the Executive Committee of the American Economic Association and will only take place if a former honorary member dies.

Why Social Preferences Matter
In his 2002 collaboration with Urs Fischbacher, Why Social Preferences Matter – The Impact of Non-Selfish Motives on Competition, Cooperation and Incentives, he begins with the abstract:

A substantial number of people exhibit social preferences, which means they are not solely motivated by material self-interest but also care positively or negatively for the material payoffs of relevant reference agents.  We show empirically that economists can fail to understand fundamental economic questions when they disregard social preferences, in particular, that without taking social preferences into account, it is not possible to understand adequately (i) effects of competition on market outcomes, (ii) laws governing cooperation and collective action, (iii) effects and the determinants of material incentives, (iv) which contracts and property rights arrangements are optimal, and (v) important forces shaping social norms and market failures.

He conjectures that we could call economics "the dismal science" because it consistently assumes the worst in human motives, which contrasts sharply with the pervasive idea that consumer tastes are heterogeneous.  He attacks the idea on two fronts.  First, because a great amount of evidence has contradicted the selfishness hypothesis; second, because failure to regard other-concerning behavior ignores central market activities.

See also
 Dictator game
 Inequity aversion
 List of publications in economics

Selected bibliography

References

External links 
 University of Zürich, Department of Economics
 Homepage of Ernst Fehr
 FehrAdvice & Partners AG, The Behavioral Economics Consultancy Group

1956 births
Living people
People from Bregenz District
Austrian economists
Swiss economists
Experimental economists
Academic staff of the University of Zurich
Neuroeconomists
Austrian expatriates in Switzerland
Recipients of the Austrian Decoration for Science and Art
Fellows of the Econometric Society
Fellows of the American Academy of Arts and Sciences
Fellows of the Association for Psychological Science
Members of Academia Europaea
Labor economists
Fellows of the European Economic Association